Thomas Louis Habeeb (born April 26, 1958), also known as Tommy Habeeb and Tommy Grand, is an American television host, best known for hosting the reality TV show Cheaters, as well as hosting uncensored pay-per-view specials of Cheaters on Events iN Demand. He was also host and executive producer of the reality show STAG, which airs on Events iN Demand. Habeeb hosts the Golf special The Art of Golf Club Fitting. He currently hosts and executive produces the hit TV show To the Rescue.

Career
Habeeb worked on films and television shows before rising to stardom on Cheaters, which made its debut in 1999.

Habeeb produced and hosted the first 84 episodes of Cheaters. In addition, Habeeb produced the television broadcast for a number of live sports programs: Art of War Undisputed Arena Fighting Championship for HDNET and Champs Boxing for Telfutura. Habeeb also produced An Eye for an Eye and the series The Big Big Show, which starred Andrew Dice Clay, Tara Reid, and Tom Green.

Filmography

Host
 To The Rescue (2020-2022)
 The Art of Golf Club Fitting (2019)
 Movies at the Statler (2018-2019)
 The Big Big Show (2015)
 Beer, Babes, and Movies
 Billionaires Car Club (2017)
 SPCALA Telethon
 Mrs World (2005)
 STAG (2005–2008)
 Eye for an Eye (2000–2002)
 Cheaters (2000–2002)
 SpeedZone (1996)

Producer
 The Big Big Show (2015)
 Beer, Babes & Movies (2009)
 Billionaires Car Club (2008)
 STAG (2005–2008)
 Art of War 3 (2007)
 Champs Boxing (2003)
 Cheaters'' (2000)

References

External links
Tommy Habeeb's official website

To The Rescue website
STAG official website
Cheaters official website

Billionaires Car Club official website

1958 births
Living people
American people of Lebanese descent
People from Corpus Christi, Texas
University of California, Los Angeles alumni
Television personalities from Texas